The final round of the 2013 FIBA Asia Championship was a series of games in the 2013 FIBA Asia Championship in the Philippines to determine the final rankings of teams ranked 8th and above. Games were held in the Mall of Asia Arena in Pasay from August 9 to 11.

The final round was a single-elimination tournament with a consolation round for fifth place and a third-place playoff. The finalists and the winner of the third place playoff qualified for the 2014 FIBA Basketball World Cup in Spain.

Championship bracket

Consolation bracket

Quarterfinals

Iran vs. Jordan

|-
|4 ||align=left|Mohammad Jamshidi ||20:08 ||3-7 ||43 ||1-3 ||33 ||4-4 ||100 ||1 ||1 ||2 ||1 ||1 ||4 ||2 ||0 ||11
|-
|5 ||align=left|Aren Davoudi ||15:44 ||0-4 ||0 ||0-2 ||0 ||0-0 ||0 ||1 ||0 ||1 ||1 ||5 ||2 ||1 ||0 ||0
|-
|6 ||align=left|Javad Davari ||07:10 ||1-3 ||33 ||0-1 ||0 ||0-0 ||0 ||0 ||0 ||0 ||2 ||1 ||0 ||0 ||0 ||2
|-
|7 ||align=left|Mehdi Kamrani ||25:37 ||5-11 ||45 ||0-2 ||0 ||1-2 ||50 ||0 ||3 ||3 ||11 ||0 ||0 ||2 ||0 ||11
|-
|8 ||align=left|Saman Veisi ||07:39 ||0-1 ||0 ||0-0 ||0 ||0-0 ||0 ||0 ||3 ||3 ||1 ||1 ||1 ||0 ||0 ||0
|-
|9 ||align=left|Oshin Sahakian ||19:33 ||5-5 ||100 ||1-1 ||100 ||3-3 ||100 ||5 ||4 ||9 ||2 ||4 ||0 ||1 ||0 ||14
|-
|10 ||align=left|Hamed Afagh ||26:37 ||6-7 ||86 ||4-5 ||80 ||2-2 ||100 ||1 ||2 ||3 ||0 ||2 ||3 ||0 ||0 ||18
|-
|11 ||align=left|Hamed Sohrabnejad ||05:58 ||2-2 ||100 ||1-1 ||100 ||0-0 ||0 ||0 ||1 ||1 ||0 ||0 ||0 ||0 ||0 ||5
|-
|12 ||align=left|Asghar Kardoust ||12:46 ||1-2 ||50 ||0-0 ||0 ||0-0 ||0 ||1 ||1 ||2 ||0 ||1 ||0 ||0 ||1 ||2
|-
|13 ||align=left|Rouzbeh Arghavan ||16:32 ||1-3 ||33 ||1-2 ||50 ||0-0 ||0 ||1 ||6 ||7 ||0 ||3 ||1 ||0 ||1 ||3
|-
|14 ||align=left|Samad Nikkhah Bahrami ||17:00 ||2-6 ||33 ||2-4 ||50 ||2-2 ||100 ||0 ||2 ||2 ||3 ||3 ||3 ||1 ||0 ||8 
|-
|15 ||align=left|Hamed Haddadi ||25:08 ||7-13 ||54 ||0-1 ||0 ||6-8 ||75 ||2 ||6 ||8 ||0 ||1 ||1 ||1 ||3 ||20
|-
|align=left colspan=2|Totals || ||33-64 ||52 ||10-22 ||45 ||18-21 ||86 ||12 ||29 ||41 ||21 ||22 ||15 ||8 ||5 ||94
|}

|-
|4 ||align=left|Fadel Alnajjar ||11:32 ||0-3 ||0 ||0-1 ||0 ||1-2 ||50 ||0 ||2 ||2 ||0 ||1 ||1 ||0 ||0 ||1
|-
|5 ||align=left|Ahmad al Dwairi ||15:52 ||2-2 ||100 ||0-0 ||0 ||0-0 ||0 ||1 ||1 ||2 ||0 ||2 ||2 ||0 ||0 ||4
|-
|6 ||align=left|Hani Alfaraj ||14:30 ||1-4 ||25 ||0-2 ||0 ||0-1 ||0 ||0 ||0 ||0 ||1 ||2 ||1 ||1 ||1 ||2
|-
|7 ||align=left|Ahmad Alhamarsheh ||24:16 ||1-6 ||17 ||0-2 ||0 ||3-4 ||75 ||1 ||1 ||2 ||0 ||3 ||2 ||2 ||0 ||5
|-
|8 ||align=left|Jimmy Baxter ||29:05 ||4-14 ||29 ||2-5 ||40 ||3-7 ||43 ||1 ||1 ||2 ||4 ||1 ||2 ||1 ||0 ||13
|-
|9 ||align=left|Khaldoon Abu-Ruqayyah ||10:29 ||1-2 ||50 ||0-1 ||0 ||2-4 ||50 ||0 ||0 ||0 ||0 ||1 ||0 ||0 ||0 ||4
|-
|10 ||align=left|Abdallah AbuQoura ||09:50 ||1-3 ||33 ||0-0 ||0 ||0-0 ||0 ||1 ||0 ||1 ||0 ||0 ||1 ||0 ||2 ||2
|-
|11 ||align=left|Wesam Al-Sous ||21:04 ||1-7 ||14 ||1-6 ||17 ||0-0 ||0 ||1 ||0 ||1 ||2 ||2 ||2 ||0 ||0 ||3
|-
|12 ||align=left|Mahmoud Abdeen ||10:52 ||0-4 ||0 ||0-3 ||0 ||2-2 ||100 ||0 ||0 ||0 ||3 ||0 ||1 ||0 ||0 ||2
|-
|13 ||align=left|Mohammad Shaher Hussein ||12:04 ||0-3 ||0 ||0-0 ||0 ||0-0 ||0 ||1 ||2 ||3 ||0 ||3 ||2 ||0 ||1 ||0
|-
|14 ||align=left|Mohammad Hadrab ||24:26 ||2-3 ||67 ||2-2 ||100 ||2-2 ||100 ||2 ||6 ||8 ||1 ||3 ||2 ||0 ||0 ||8
|-
|15 ||align=left|Ali Jamal Zaghab ||15:55 ||2-2 ||100 ||0-0 ||0 ||2-3 ||67 ||1 ||2 ||3 ||0 ||3 ||1 ||2 ||1 ||6
|-
|align=left colspan=2|Totals || ||15-53 ||28 ||5-22 ||23 ||15-25 ||60 ||9 ||15 ||24 ||11 ||21 ||17 ||6 ||5 ||50
|}

Chinese Taipei vs. China

|-
|4 ||align=left|Tseng Wen-ting ||08:50 ||0-1 ||0 ||0-0 ||0 ||0-0 ||0 ||0 ||1 ||1 ||2 ||2 ||3 ||0 ||1 ||0
|-
|5 ||align=left|Quincy Davis ||37:47 ||12-13 ||92 ||0-1 ||0 ||2-4 ||50 ||4 ||6 ||10 ||1 ||3 ||1 ||0 ||3 ||26
|-
|6 ||align=left|Lee Hsueh-lin ||colspan=16 align=left|Did not play
|-
|7 ||align=left|Tien Lei ||33:21 ||4-9 ||44 ||3-4 ||75 ||2-2 ||100 ||1 ||4 ||5 ||4 ||3 ||1 ||3 ||1 ||13
|-
|8 ||align=left|Chen Shih-chieh ||03:25 ||0-0 ||0 ||0-0 ||0 ||0-0 ||0 ||0 ||0 ||0 ||0 ||2 ||1 ||0 ||0 ||0
|-
|9 ||align=left|Hung Chih-shan ||30:19 ||4-8 ||50 ||3-6 ||50 ||0-0 ||0 ||0 ||4 ||4 ||5 ||2 ||1 ||0 ||0 ||11
|-
|10 ||align=left|Chou Po-Chen ||colspan=16 align=left|Did not play
|-
|11 ||align=left|Yang Chin-min ||04:10 ||0-0 ||0 ||0-0 ||0 ||1-2 ||50 ||0 ||1 ||1 ||0 ||1 ||0 ||0 ||0 ||1
|-
|12 ||align=left|Lin Chih-chieh ||26:44 ||6-14 ||43 ||2-5 ||40 ||3-3 ||100 ||0 ||2 ||2 ||7 ||0 ||3 ||1 ||0 ||17
|-
|13 ||align=left|Lu Cheng-ju ||20:37 ||3-5 ||60 ||1-3 ||33 ||0-0 ||0 ||0 ||1 ||1 ||0 ||4 ||2 ||1 ||0 ||7
|-
|14 ||align=left|Tsai Wen-cheng ||34:42 ||7-10 ||70 ||1-1 ||100 ||6-9 ||67 ||3 ||4 ||7 ||2 ||1 ||1 ||1 ||0 ||21
|-
|15 ||align=left|Douglas Creighton ||colspan=16 align=left|Did not play
|-
|align=left colspan=2|Totals || ||36-60 ||60 ||10-20 ||50 ||14-20 ||70 ||8 ||23 ||31 ||21 ||18 ||13 ||6 ||5 ||96
|}

|-
|4 ||align=left|Guo Ailun ||24:58 ||1-6 ||17 ||0-3 ||0 ||0-2 ||0 ||0 ||1 ||1 ||7 ||2 ||1 ||2 ||0 ||2
|-
|5 ||align=left|Liu Xiaoyu ||07:31 ||0-0 ||0 ||0-0 ||0 ||0-0 ||0 ||1 ||0 ||1 ||1 ||0 ||0 ||0 ||0 ||0
|-
|6 ||align=left|Chen Jianghua ||02:08 ||0-1 ||0 ||0-1 ||0 ||0-0 ||0 ||0 ||0 ||0 ||0 ||0 ||0 ||0 ||0 ||0
|-
|7 ||align=left|Wang Shipeng ||26:55 ||6-14 ||43 ||3-9 ||33 ||2-5 ||40 ||0 ||4 ||4 ||4 ||1 ||2 ||0 ||0 ||17
|-
|8 ||align=left|Zhu Fangyu ||22:51 ||4-6 ||67 ||3-3 ||100 ||0-0 ||0 ||0 ||1 ||1 ||1 ||2 ||1 ||1 ||0 ||11
|-
|9 ||align=left|Sun Yue ||19:44 ||0-3 ||0 ||0-3 ||0 ||0-0 ||0 ||0 ||0 ||0 ||3 ||3 ||0 ||0 ||0 ||0
|-
|10 ||align=left|Li Xiaoxu ||colspan=16 align=left|Did not play
|-
|11 ||align=left|Yi Jianlian ||27:27 ||11-18 ||61 ||0-1 ||0 ||0-0 ||0 ||5 ||5 ||10 ||1 ||2 ||2 ||0 ||0 ||22
|-
|12 ||align=left|Zhang Bo ||04:24 ||0-2 ||0 ||0-0 ||0 ||0-0 ||0 ||0 ||1 ||1 ||0 ||0 ||0 ||0 ||0 ||0
|-
|13 ||align=left|Wang Zhelin ||15:26 ||4-7 ||57 ||0-0 ||0 ||2-2 ||100 ||2 ||2 ||4 ||1 ||2 ||1 ||1 ||0 ||10
|-
|14 ||align=left|Wang Zhizhi ||20:39 ||2-4 ||50 ||1-2 ||50 ||4-4 ||100 ||2 ||1 ||3 ||1 ||4 ||3 ||0 ||0 ||9
|-
|15 ||align=left|Zhou Peng ||27:50 ||2-6 ||33 ||0-2 ||0 ||3-3 ||100 ||1 ||3 ||4 ||0 ||1 ||2 ||0 ||1 ||7
|-
|align=left colspan=2|Totals || ||30-67 ||45 ||7-24 ||29 ||11-16 ||69 ||11 ||18 ||29 ||19 ||17 ||12 ||4 ||1 ||78
|}

Philippines vs. Kazakhstan

|-
|4 ||align=left|Jimmy Alapag ||11:24 ||1-3 ||33 ||0-2 ||0 ||0-0 ||0 ||0 ||1 ||1 ||1 ||1 ||0 ||0 ||0 ||2
|-
|5 ||align=left|LA Tenorio ||17:23 ||1-5 ||20 ||1-4 ||25 ||0-0 ||0 ||1 ||4 ||5 ||4 ||1 ||1 ||0 ||0 ||3
|-
|6 ||align=left|Jeffrei Chan ||20:06 ||3-9 ||33 ||1-6 ||17 ||0-0 ||0 ||0 ||2 ||2 ||3 ||0 ||1 ||0 ||0 ||7
|-
|7 ||align=left|Jayson William ||17:43 ||4-5 ||80 ||2-3 ||67 ||3-4 ||75 ||0 ||1 ||1 ||4 ||1 ||0 ||1 ||0 ||13
|-
|8 ||align=left|Gary David ||17:33 ||7-11 ||64 ||4-6 ||67 ||4-4 ||100 ||0 ||2 ||2 ||1 ||1 ||0 ||0 ||0 ||22 
|-
|9 ||align=left|Ranidel de Ocampo ||12:03 ||2-4 ||50 ||2-3 ||67 ||0-0 ||0 ||2 ||1 ||3 ||1 ||4 ||1 ||1 ||0 ||6 
|-
|10 ||align=left|Gabe Norwood ||20:42 ||4-4 ||100 ||2-2 ||100 ||0-0 ||0 ||0 ||2 ||2 ||1 ||1 ||0 ||0 ||1 ||10
|-
|11 ||align=left|Marcus Douthit ||22:53 ||2-9 ||22 ||0-0 ||0 ||1-2 ||50 ||0 ||10 ||10 ||2 ||1 ||2 ||0 ||2 ||5
|-
|12 ||align=left|Larry Fonacier ||15:05 ||1-6 ||17 ||1-4 ||25 ||0-0 ||0 ||1 ||1 ||2 ||4 ||0 ||0 ||1 ||0 ||3
|-
|13 ||align=left|June Mar Fajardo ||03:45 ||0-1 ||0 ||0-0 ||0 ||0-0 ||0 ||0 ||3 ||3 ||0 ||4 ||2 ||0 ||0 ||0
|-
|14 ||align=left|Japeth Aguilar ||24:06 ||3-4 ||75 ||0-0 ||0 ||5-6 ||83 ||1 ||8 ||9 ||1 ||2 ||2 ||0 ||2 ||11
|-
|15 ||align=left|Marc Pingris ||17:10 ||3-4 ||75 ||0-0 ||0 ||0-0 ||0 ||1 ||2 ||3 ||1 ||4 ||0 ||0 ||2 ||6
|-
|align=left colspan=2|Totals || ||31-65 ||48 ||13-30 ||43 ||13-16 ||81 ||6 ||37 ||43 ||23 ||20 ||9 ||3 ||7 ||88
|}

|-
|4 ||align=left|Timur Sultanov ||18:23 ||1-2 ||50 ||1-2 ||50 ||0-0 ||0 ||0 ||1 ||1 ||1 ||1 ||3 ||0 ||0 ||3
|-
|5 ||align=left|Jerry Jamar Jonson ||27:11 ||2-11 ||18 ||1-4 ||25 ||3-4 ||75 ||0 ||1 ||1 ||3 ||3 ||0 ||0 ||0 ||8
|-
|6 ||align=left|Rustam Murzagaliyev ||21:37 ||2-5 ||40 ||1-2 ||50 ||0-0 ||0 ||0 ||1 ||1 ||2 ||0 ||1 ||0 ||0 ||5
|-00
|7 ||align=left|Mikhail Yevstigneyev ||13:15 ||3-9 ||33 ||0-0 ||0 ||0-0 ||0 ||3 ||1 ||4 ||1 ||0 ||2 ||1 ||0 ||6
|-
|8 ||align=left|Vitaliy Lapchenko ||14:16 ||2-6 ||33 ||0-2 ||0 ||1-2 ||50 ||0 ||0 ||0 ||0 ||1 ||0 ||0 ||0 ||5
|-
|9 ||align=left|Nikolay Bazhini ||03:32 ||0-1 ||0 ||0-1 ||0 ||0-0 ||0 ||0 ||2 ||2 ||0 ||0 ||0 ||0 ||0 ||0
|-
|10 ||align=left|Konstantin Dvirnyy ||colspan=16 align=left|Did not play
|-
|11 ||align=left|Anton Ponomarev ||28:00 ||3-10 ||30 ||0-2 ||0 ||2-2 ||100 ||4 ||8 ||12 ||0 ||3 ||1 ||0 ||1 ||8
|-
|12 ||align=left[Dmitriy Klimov ||24:43 ||4-8 ||50 ||4-7 ||57 ||2-2 ||100 ||1 ||8 ||9 ||3 ||3 ||1 ||0 ||0 ||14
|-
|13 ||align=left|Rustam Yargaliyev ||24:20 ||1-5 ||20 ||0-2 ||0 ||0-0 ||0 ||0 ||3 ||3 ||3 ||1 ||1 ||0 ||0 ||2
|-
|14 ||align=left|Leonid Bondarovich ||12:28 ||2-9 ||22 ||0-0 ||0 ||0-0 ||0 ||2 ||0 ||2 ||0 ||4 ||0 ||0 ||0 ||4
|-
|15 ||align=left|Alexander Zhigulin ||12:11 ||1-3 ||33 ||1-3 ||33 ||0-0 ||0 ||0 ||3 ||3 ||0 ||0 ||1 ||0 ||0 ||3
|-
|align=left colspan=2|Totals || ||21-69 ||30 ||8-25 ||32 ||8-10 ||80 ||10 ||28 ||38 ||13 ||16 ||10 ||1 ||1 ||58
|}

Korea vs. Qatar

|-
|4 ||align=left|Kim Min-Goo ||25:12 ||2-11 ||18 ||0-6 ||0 ||5-5 ||100 ||2 ||5 ||7 ||4 ||2 ||1 ||1 ||0 ||9
|-
|5 ||align=left|Kim Sun-Hyung ||14:31 ||3-7 ||43 ||1-1 ||100 ||0-0 ||0 ||0 ||4 ||4 ||1 ||0 ||0 ||0 ||0 ||7
|-
|6 ||align=left|Yang Dong-Geun ||13:43 ||3-5 ||60 ||1-3 ||33 ||0-2 ||0 ||0 ||3 ||3 ||2 ||2 ||1 ||3 ||0 ||7
|-00
|7 ||align=left|Kim Tae-Sul ||19:56 ||2-5 ||40 ||2-3 ||67 ||0-0 ||0 ||0 ||3 ||3 ||4 ||1 ||1 ||0 ||0 ||6 
|-
|8 ||align=left|Moon Seong-Gon ||colspan=16 align=left|Did not play
|-
|9 ||align=left|Yun Ho-Young ||20:54 ||4-8 ||50 ||2-2 ||100 ||0-0 ||0 ||2 ||2 ||4 ||2 ||4 ||2 ||0 ||1 ||10
|-
|10 ||align=left|Cho Sung-Min ||21:06 ||6-9 ||67 ||2-4 ||50 ||2-2 ||100 ||0 ||1 ||1 ||1 ||3 ||2 ||1 ||0 ||16
|-
|11 ||align=left|Kim Joo-Sung ||31:47 ||2-7 ||29 ||0-0 ||0 ||0-0 ||0 ||1 ||2 ||3 ||3 ||3 ||1 ||2 ||0 ||4 
|-
|12 ||align=left|Kim Jong-Kyu ||16:11 ||3-5 ||60 ||0-0 ||0 ||0-0 ||0 ||3 ||2 ||5 ||2 ||2 ||0 ||0 ||0 ||6
|-
|13 ||align=left|Choi Jun-Yong ||04:33 ||0-1 ||0 ||0-0 ||0 ||0-0 ||0 ||0 ||0 ||0 ||0 ||0 ||0 ||0 ||0 ||0
|-
|14 ||align=left|Lee Seung-Jun ||15:49 ||5-9 ||56 ||0-2 ||0 ||2-2 ||100 ||0 ||3 ||3 ||0 ||2 ||1 ||0 ||0 ||12
|-
|15 ||align=left|Lee Jong-Hyun ||16:11 ||1-2 ||50 ||0-0 ||0 ||0-0 ||0 ||1 ||3 ||4 ||0 ||1 ||1 ||1 ||1 ||2
|-
|align=left colspan=2|Totals || ||31-69 ||45 ||8-21 ||38 ||9-11 ||82 ||9 ||28 ||37 ||19 ||20 ||10 ||8 ||2 ||79
|}

|-
|4 ||align=left|Mansour El Hadary ||21:57 ||1-5 ||20 ||0-2 ||0 ||1-1 ||100 ||1 ||1 ||2 ||0 ||4 ||5 ||0 ||1 ||3
|-
|5 ||align=left|Jarvis Hayes ||20:04 ||3-8 ||38 ||0-2 ||0 ||4-4 ||100 ||0 ||6 ||6 ||1 ||0 ||1 ||1 ||1 ||10
|-
|6 ||align=left|Abdulrahman Saad ||15:45 ||2-5 ||40 ||0-2 ||0 ||2-3 ||67 ||2 ||3 ||5 ||1 ||4 ||2 ||0 ||0 ||6
|-
|7 ||align=left|Daoud Musa ||27:38 ||1-2 ||50 ||0-0 ||0 ||1-2 ||50 ||3 ||2 ||5 ||2 ||1 ||2 ||0 ||1 ||3
|-
|8 ||align=left|Khalid Suliman ||26:59 ||2-7 ||29 ||0-0 ||0 ||6-8 ||75 ||2 ||1 ||3 ||2 ||0 ||1 ||1 ||0 ||10
|-
|9 ||align=left|Ali Turki Ali ||07:58 ||2-3 ||67 ||2-3 ||67 ||0-0 ||0 ||0 ||1 ||1 ||0 ||1 ||1 ||0 ||0 ||6
|-
|10 ||align=left|Yasseen Musa ||28:50 ||3-11 ||27 ||0-3 ||0 ||3-4 ||75 ||0 ||4 ||4 ||4 ||2 ||2 ||0 ||1 ||9
|-
|11 ||align=left|Erfan Ali Saeed ||18:00 ||0-4 ||0 ||0-2 ||0 ||1-2 ||50 ||0 ||2 ||2 ||0 ||0 ||0 ||0 ||0 ||1
|-
|12 ||align=left|Mohammed Saleem Abdulla ||10:00 ||1-6 ||17 ||0-2 ||0 ||0-0 ||0 ||0 ||3 ||3 ||0 ||0 ||0 ||0 ||0 ||2
|-
|13 ||align=left|Mohammed Yousef ||14:22 ||0-2 ||0 ||0-0 ||0 ||0-0 ||0 ||3 ||1 ||4 ||0 ||2 ||1 ||0 ||1 ||0
|-
|14 ||align=left|Malek Saleem ||03:45 ||0-0 ||0 ||0-0 ||0 ||0-0 ||0 ||0 ||0 ||0 ||0 ||0 ||0 ||0 ||0 ||0
|-
|15 ||align=left|Baker Ahmad Mohammed ||04:35 ||1-2 ||50 ||0-1 ||0 ||0-0 ||0 ||0 ||0 ||0 ||1 ||0 ||1 ||0 ||0 ||2
|-
|align=left colspan=2|Totals || ||16-55 ||29 ||2-17 ||12 ||18-24 ||75 ||11 ||24 ||35 ||11 ||14 ||16 ||2 ||5 ||52
|}

Semifinals 5th–8th

Jordan vs. China

|-
|4 ||align=left|Fadel Alnajjar ||07:55 ||0-1 ||0 ||0-1 ||0 ||0-0 ||0 ||0 ||0 ||0 ||2 ||1 ||0 ||0 ||0 ||0
|-
|5 ||align=left|Ahmad al Dwairi ||04:33 ||0-1 ||0 ||0-0 ||0 ||1-2 ||50 ||0 ||0 ||0 ||0 ||5 ||1 ||0 ||1 ||1
|-
|6 ||align=left|Hani Alfaraj ||13:13 ||3-4 ||75 ||1-1 ||100 ||0-0 ||0 ||2 ||1 ||3 ||1 ||0 ||1 ||0 ||0 ||7
|-
|7 ||align=left|Ahmad Alhamarsheh ||22:27 ||2-4 ||50 ||1-2 ||50 ||1-1 ||100 ||0 ||5 ||5 ||0 ||5 ||2 ||1 ||0 ||6
|-
|8 ||align=left|Jimmy Baxter ||38:20 ||4-13 ||31 ||0-3 ||0 ||5-6 ||83 ||0 ||1 ||1 ||8 ||1 ||0 ||1 ||0 ||13
|-
|9 ||align=left|Khaldoon Abu-Ruqayyah ||04:49 ||1-3 ||33 ||0-2 ||0 ||0-0 ||0 ||0 ||0 ||0 ||0 ||1 ||2 ||0 ||0 ||2
|-
|10 ||align=left|Abdallah AbuQoura ||colspan=16 align=left|Did not play
|-
|11 ||align=left|Wesam Al-Sous ||23:46 ||6-11 ||55 ||5-10 ||50 ||0-0 ||0 ||0 ||1 ||1 ||1 ||1 ||2 ||1 ||0 ||17
|-
|12 ||align=left|Mahmoud Abdeen ||16:24 ||2-3 ||67 ||1-2 ||50 ||0-0 ||0 ||0 ||3 ||3 ||2 ||2 ||1 ||0 ||0 ||5
|-
|13 ||align=left|Mohammad Shaher Hussein ||15:47 ||3-7 ||43 ||0-0 ||0 ||1-2 ||50 ||1 ||3 ||4 ||0 ||5 ||0 ||0 ||1 ||7
|-
|14 ||align=left|Mohammad Hadrab ||33:02 ||4-11 ||36 ||0-3 ||0 ||5-6 ||83 ||3 ||5 ||8 ||3 ||1 ||3 ||0 ||2 ||13
|-
|15 ||align=left|Ali Jamal Zaghab ||19:38 ||2-4 ||50 ||0-0 ||0 ||1-2 ||50 ||2 ||2 ||4 ||0 ||4 ||0 ||1 ||0 ||5
|-
|align=left colspan=2|Totals || ||27-62 ||44 ||8-24 ||33 ||14-19 ||74 ||8 ||21 ||29 ||17 ||26 ||12 ||4 ||4 ||76
|}

|-
|4 ||align=left|Guo Ailun ||10:56 ||0-2 ||0 ||0-1 ||0 ||0-0 ||0 ||0 ||0 ||0 ||2 ||2 ||0 ||0 ||0 ||0
|-
|5 ||align=left|Liu Xiaoyu ||18:50 ||0-1 ||0 ||0-1 ||0 ||0-0 ||0 ||0 ||0 ||0 ||1 ||4 ||1 ||0 ||0 ||0
|-
|6 ||align=left|Chen Jianghua ||colspan=16 align=left|Did not play
|-
|7 ||align=left|Wang Shipeng ||29:03 ||3-6 ||50 ||0-2 ||0 ||0-0 ||0 ||0 ||4 ||4 ||4 ||0 ||1 ||2 ||0 ||6
|-
|8 ||align=left|Zhu Fangyu ||12:43 ||0-1 ||0 ||0-1 ||0 ||1-2 ||50 ||0 ||3 ||3 ||0 ||2 ||1 ||0 ||0 ||1
|-
|9 ||align=left|Sun Yue ||21:53 ||0-4 ||0 ||0-1 ||0 ||0-0 ||0 ||0 ||5 ||5 ||6 ||3 ||0 ||0 ||0 ||0
|-
|10 ||align=left|Li Xiaoxu ||colspan=16 align=left|Did not play
|-
|11 ||align=left|Yi Jianlian ||32:26 ||6-12 ||50 ||0-0 ||0 ||6-10 ||60 ||1 ||3 ||4 ||5 ||2 ||4 ||1 ||0 ||18
|-
|12 ||align=left|Zhang Bo ||colspan=16 align=left|Did not play
|-
|13 ||align=left|Wang Zhelin ||16:12 ||3-7 ||43 ||0-0 ||0 ||2-4 ||50 ||1 ||3 ||4 ||0 ||1 ||0 ||1 ||0 ||8
|-
|14 ||align=left|Wang Zhizhi ||23:03 ||12-13 ||92 ||0-0 ||0 ||9-12 ||75 ||2 ||5 ||7 ||3 ||3 ||0 ||0 ||0 ||33
|-
|15 ||align=left|Zhou Peng ||34:49 ||5-7 ||71 ||1-3 ||33 ||2-4 ||50 ||0 ||2 ||2 ||0 ||2 ||4 ||1 ||0 ||13
|-
|align=left colspan=2|Totals || ||29-53 ||55 ||1-9 ||11 ||20-32 ||63 ||4 ||25 ||29 ||21 ||19 ||11 ||5 ||0 ||79
|}

Kazakhstan vs. Qatar

|-
|4 ||align=left|Timur Sultanov ||19:45 ||3-5 ||60 ||2-3 ||67 ||0-0 ||0 ||0 ||1 ||1 ||3 ||4 ||1 ||0 ||0 ||8
|-
|5 ||align=left|Jerry Jamar Johnson ||33:17 ||3-14 ||21 ||0-6 ||0 ||3-3 ||100 ||1 ||1 ||2 ||4 ||4 ||2 ||0 ||0 ||9
|-
|6 ||align=left|Rustam Murzagaliyev ||09:37 ||0-1 ||0 ||0-1 ||0 ||0-0 ||0 ||0 ||0 ||0 ||2 ||1 ||0 ||0 ||0 ||0
|-00
|7 ||align=left|Mikhail Yevstigneyev ||25:39 ||10-15 ||67 ||0-1 ||0 ||4-5 ||80 ||6 ||7 ||13 ||1 ||3 ||3 ||0 ||0 ||24
|-
|8 ||align=left|Vitaliy Lapchenko ||15:00 ||3-5 ||60 ||1-2 ||50 ||0-0 ||0 ||1 ||1 ||2 ||0 ||2 ||0 ||1 ||0 ||7
|-
|9 ||align=left|Nikolay Bazhini ||07:08 ||1-1 ||100 ||0-0 ||0 ||0-0 ||0 ||0 ||2 ||2 ||0 ||1 ||1 ||0 ||0 ||2
|-
|10 ||align=left|Konstantin Dvirnyy ||colspan=16 align=left|Did not play
|-
|11 ||align=left|Anton Ponomarev ||27:54 ||2-7 ||29 ||1-4 ||25 ||0-0 ||0 ||3 ||4 ||7 ||2 ||3 ||1 ||1 ||0 ||5
|-
|12 ||align=left|Dmitriy Klimov ||22:08 ||0-2 ||0 ||0-2 ||0 ||2-4 ||50 ||1 ||7 ||8 ||1 ||3 ||2 ||0 ||0 ||2
|-
|13 ||align=left|Rustam Yargaliyev ||28:02 ||4-15 ||27 ||0-5 ||0 ||0-0 ||0 ||0 ||1 ||1 ||3 ||2 ||5 ||0 ||0 ||8
|-
|14 ||align=left|Leonid Bondarovich ||04:44 ||1-4 ||25 ||0-0 ||0 ||0-0 ||0 ||0 ||0 ||0 ||0 ||1 ||0 ||0 ||0 ||2
|-
|15 ||align=left|Alexander Zhigulin ||06:40 ||0-1 ||0 ||0-1 ||0 ||0-0 ||0 ||0 ||0 ||0 ||0 ||0 ||0 ||0 ||0 ||0
|-
|align=left colspan=2|Totals || ||27-70 ||39 ||4-25 ||16 ||9-12 ||75 ||12 ||24 ||36 ||16 ||24 ||15 ||2 ||0 ||67
|}

|-
|4 ||align=left|Mansour El Hadary ||27:33 ||1-3 ||33 ||0-0 ||0 ||5-8 ||63 ||0 ||6 ||6 ||2 ||2 ||1 ||0 ||0 ||7
|-
|5 ||align=left|Jarvis Hayes ||colspan=16 align=left|Did not play
|-
|6 ||align=left|Abdulrahman Saad ||16:28 ||2-6 ||33 ||1-3 ||33 ||2-2 ||100 ||0 ||3 ||3 ||0 ||2 ||2 ||1 ||0 ||7
|-
|7 ||align=left|Daoud Musa ||32:55 ||6-11 ||55 ||1-5 ||20 ||2-2 ||100 ||0 ||2 ||2 ||3 ||0 ||3 ||1 ||1 ||15
|-
|8 ||align=left|Khalid Suliman ||11:42 ||0-1 ||0 ||0-1 ||0 ||1-2 ||50 ||1 ||2 ||3 ||1 ||3 ||1 ||0 ||0 ||1
|-
|9 ||align=left|Ali Turki Ali ||23:31 ||3-8 ||38 ||1-5 ||20 ||1-2 ||50 ||2 ||3 ||5 ||0 ||1 ||1 ||0 ||0 ||8
|-
|10 ||align=left|Yasseen Musa ||31:36 ||7-13 ||54 ||0-0 ||0 ||4-4 ||100 ||2 ||3 ||5 ||2 ||1 ||1 ||1 ||1 ||18
|-
|11 ||align=left|Erfan Ali Saeed ||colspan=16 align=left|Did not play
|-
|12 ||align=left|Mohammed Saleem Abdulla ||21:59 ||0-4 ||0 ||0-1 ||0 ||2-2 ||100 ||0 ||3 ||3 ||0 ||3 ||1 ||0 ||0 ||2
|-
|13 ||align=left|Mohammed Yousef ||21:44 ||0-4 ||0 ||0-1 ||0 ||2-2 ||100 ||1 ||3 ||4 ||2 ||4 ||1 ||1 ||1 ||2
|-
|14 ||align=left|Malek Saleem ||colspan=16 align=left|Did not play
|-
|15 ||align=left|Baker Ahmad Mohammed ||12:27 ||3-7 ||43 ||0-0 ||0 ||6-8 ||75 ||2 ||1 ||3 ||0 ||0 ||2 ||0 ||0 ||12
|-
|align=left colspan=2|Totals || ||22-57 ||39 ||3-16 ||19 ||25-32 ||78 ||8 ||26 ||34 ||10 ||16 ||13 ||4 ||3 ||72
|}

Semifinals

Iran vs. Chinese Taipei

|-
|4 ||align=left|Mohammad Jamshidi ||06:04 ||1-4 ||25 ||0-3 ||0 ||0-0 ||0 ||0 ||2 ||2 ||1 ||0 ||1 ||0 ||0 ||2
|-
|5 ||align=left|Aren Davoudi ||19:25 ||1-2 ||50 ||0-1 ||0 ||0-0 ||0 ||3 ||1 ||4 ||3 ||3 ||2 ||0 ||0 ||2
|-
|6 ||align=left|Javad Davari ||colspan=16 align=left|Did not play
|-
|7 ||align=left|Mehdi Kamrani ||29:42 ||8-10 ||80 ||1-3 ||33 ||2-4 ||50 ||0 ||6 ||6 ||6 ||3 ||1 ||2 ||0 ||19
|-
|8 ||align=left|Saman Veisi ||colspan=16 align=left|Did not play
|-
|9 ||align=left|Oshin Sahakian ||26:34 ||6-11 ||55 ||0-3 ||0 ||1-2 ||50 ||1 ||7 ||8 ||3 ||2 ||1 ||0 ||0 ||13
|-
|10 ||align=left|Hamed Afagh ||33:59 ||4-10 ||40 ||1-5 ||20 ||1-1 ||100 ||1 ||2 ||3 ||4 ||2 ||0 ||4 ||0 ||10
|-
|11 ||align=left|Hamed Sohrabnejad ||08:57 ||0-2 ||0 ||0-1 ||0 ||0-0 ||0 ||0 ||2 ||2 ||0 ||2 ||0 ||0 ||0 ||0
|-
|12 ||align=left|Asghar Kardoust ||12:19 ||3-4 ||75 ||0-0 ||0 ||2-2 ||100 ||2 ||3 ||5 ||0 ||0 ||0 ||0 ||1 ||8
|-
|13 ||align=left|Rouzbeh Arghavan ||04:11 ||0-0 ||0 ||0-0 ||0 ||0-0 ||0 ||0 ||0 ||0 ||0 ||2 ||0 ||0 ||0 ||0
|-
|14 ||align=left|Samad Nikkhah Bahrami ||33:56 ||4-12 ||33 ||0-1 ||0 ||0-0 ||0 ||2 ||1 ||3 ||2 ||1 ||1 ||2 ||0 ||8
|-
|15 ||align=left|Hamed Haddadi ||24:48 ||8-17 ||47 ||0-1 ||0 ||1-4 ||25 ||8 ||6 ||14 ||0 ||3 ||5 ||0 ||0 ||17
|-
|align=left colspan=2|Totals || ||35-72 ||49 ||2-18 ||11 ||7-13 ||54 ||17 ||30 ||47 ||19 ||18 ||11 ||8 ||1 ||79
|}

|-
|4 ||align=left|Tseng Wen-ting ||23:12 ||3-7 ||43 ||0-2 ||0 ||0-0 ||0 ||1 ||0 ||1 ||3 ||2 ||1 ||2 ||0 ||6
|-
|5 ||align=left|Quincy Davis ||29:35 ||6-9 ||67 ||0-0 ||0 ||4-6 ||67 ||2 ||3 ||5 ||1 ||2 ||1 ||0 ||1 ||16
|-
|6 ||align=left|Lee Hsueh-lin ||colspan=16 align=left|Did not play
|-
|7 ||align=left|Tien Lei ||21:03 ||1-8 ||13 ||1-4 ||25 ||1-1 ||100 ||0 ||5 ||5 ||1 ||1 ||2 ||1 ||0 ||4
|-
|8 ||align=left|Chen Shih-chieh ||14:43 ||5-7 ||71 ||0-1 ||0 ||1-2 ||50 ||0 ||1 ||1 ||0 ||0 ||1 ||0 ||0 ||11
|-
|9 ||align=left|Hung Chih-shan ||22:09 ||2-6 ||33 ||1-5 ||20 ||0-0 ||0 ||1 ||2 ||3 ||2 ||3 ||0 ||0 ||0 ||5
|-
|10 ||align=left|Chou Po-Chen ||03:36 ||0-0 ||0 ||0-0 ||0 ||0-0 ||0 ||1 ||0 ||1 ||1 ||0 ||0 ||0 ||0 ||0
|-
|11 ||align=left|Yang Chin-min ||10:59 ||1-2 ||50 ||0-1 ||0 ||0-0 ||0 ||0 ||1 ||1 ||0 ||0 ||1 ||0 ||0 ||2
|-
|12 ||align=left|Lin Chih-chieh ||19:16 ||1-6 ||17 ||1-6 ||17 ||0-0 ||0 ||0 ||3 ||3 ||2 ||0 ||4 ||0 ||0 ||3
|-
|13 ||align=left|Lu Cheng-ju ||13:24 ||2-6 ||33 ||1-4 ||25 ||0-0 ||0 ||0 ||2 ||2 ||0 ||1 ||2 ||1 ||0 ||5
|-
|14 ||align=left|Tsai Wen-cheng ||31:49 ||3-6 ||50 ||0-1 ||0 ||0-0 ||0 ||0 ||2 ||2 ||3 ||1 ||4 ||0 ||0 ||6
|-
|15 ||align=left|Douglas Creighton ||10:08 ||1-3 ||33 ||0-0 ||0 ||0-0 ||0 ||0 ||0 ||0 ||1 ||0 ||1 ||0 ||0 ||2
|-
|align=left colspan=2|Totals || ||25-60 ||42 ||4-24 ||17 ||6-9 ||67 ||5 ||19 ||24 ||14 ||10 ||17 ||4 ||1 ||60
|}

Philippines vs. Korea

|-
|4 ||align=left|Jimmy Alapag ||17:07 ||5-8 ||63 ||4-7 ||57 ||0-0 ||0 ||2 ||1 ||3 ||1 ||2 ||2 ||0 ||0 ||14
|-
|5 ||align=left|LA Tenorio ||17:56 ||4-10 ||40 ||1-3 ||33 ||0-0 ||0 ||2 ||1 ||3 ||1 ||3 ||0 ||0 ||0 ||9
|-
|6 ||align=left|Jeffrei Chan ||21:22 ||2-4 ||50 ||1-2 ||50 ||0-0 ||0 ||0 ||1 ||1 ||0 ||2 ||0 ||0 ||0 ||5
|-
|7 ||align=left|Jayson William ||23:33 ||8-13 ||62 ||1-2 ||50 ||0-1 ||0 ||0 ||3 ||3 ||3 ||1 ||2 ||0 ||1 ||17
|-
|8 ||align=left|Gary David ||04:23 ||0-3 ||0 ||0-1 ||0 ||0-0 ||0 ||2 ||0 ||2 ||0 ||1 ||0 ||1 ||0 ||0
|-
|9 ||align=left|Ranidel de Ocampo ||23:47 ||5-9 ||56 ||1-2 ||50 ||0-0 ||0 ||1 ||5 ||6 ||3 ||3 ||1 ||0 ||1 ||11
|-
|10 ||align=left|Gabe Norwood ||26:52 ||1-6 ||17 ||0-2 ||0 ||0-0 ||0 ||0 ||2 ||2 ||1 ||1 ||0 ||0 ||1 ||2
|-
|11 ||align=left|Marcus Douthit ||13:14 ||0-5 ||0 ||0-0 ||0 ||2-2 ||100 ||2 ||1 ||3 ||1 ||0 ||0 ||0 ||2 ||2
|-
|12 ||align=left|Larry Fonacier ||08:56 ||1-2 ||50 ||0-1 ||0 ||0-0 ||0 ||1 ||0 ||1 ||0 ||2 ||1 ||0 ||0 ||2
|-
|13 ||align=left|June Mar Fajardo ||colspan=16 align=left|Did not play 
|-
|14 ||align=left|Japeth Aguilar ||18:33 ||4-6 ||67 ||0-1 ||0 ||0-0 ||0 ||1 ||3 ||4 ||0 ||3 ||1 ||0 ||1 ||8
|-
|15 ||align=left|Marc Pingris ||24:12 ||7-8 ||88 ||0-0 ||0 ||2-3 ||67 ||6 ||4 ||10 ||1 ||2 ||0 ||1 ||0 ||16
|-
|align=left colspan=2|Totals || ||37-74 ||50 ||8-21 ||38 ||4-6 ||67 ||17 ||21 ||38 ||11 ||20 ||7 ||2 ||6 ||86
|}

|-
|4 ||align=left|Kim Min-Goo ||30:21 ||9-15 ||60 ||5-11 ||45 ||4-4 ||100 ||0 ||1 ||1 ||1 ||2 ||0 ||0

||0 ||27
|-
|5 ||align=left|Kim Sun-Hyung ||11:33 ||1-7 ||14 ||0-2 ||0 ||0-0 ||0 ||0 ||0 ||0 ||1 ||0 ||1 ||0 ||0 ||2
|-
|6 ||align=left|Yang Dong-Geun ||32:34 ||3-11 ||27 ||1-5 ||20 ||4-4 ||100 ||1 ||2 ||3 ||7 ||0

||0 ||1 ||0 ||11
|-00
|7 ||align=left|Kim Tae-Sul ||15:10 ||1-3 ||33 ||0-0 ||0 ||0-0 ||0 ||1 ||4 ||5 ||4 ||3 ||0 ||0 ||1 ||2
|-
|8 ||align=left|Moon Seong-Gon ||colspan=16 align=left|Did not play 
|-
|9 ||align=left|Yun Ho-Young ||08:53 ||0-0 ||0 ||0-0 ||0 ||0-0 ||0 ||0 ||2 ||2 ||0 ||0 ||0 ||0 ||0 ||0
|-
|10 ||align=left|Cho Sung-Min ||21:30 ||2-5 ||40 ||2-4 ||50 ||0-0 ||0 ||0 ||0 ||0 ||1 ||4 ||2 ||0

||0 ||6
|-
|11 ||align=left|Kim Joo-Sung ||21:19 ||4-9 ||44 ||0-0 ||0 ||3-3 ||100 ||1 ||3 ||4 ||2 ||0 ||1

||0 ||2 ||11
|-
|12 ||align=left|Kim Jong-Kyu ||21:53 ||0-4 ||0 ||0-0 ||0 ||0-0 ||0 ||1 ||4 ||5 ||0 ||1 ||3 ||0

||2 ||0
|-
|13 ||align=left|Choi Jun-Yong ||colspan=16 align=left|Did not play 
|-
|14 ||align=left|Lee Seung-Jun ||21:40 ||4-5 ||80 ||0-0 ||0 ||2-4 ||50 ||1 ||2 ||3 ||3 ||0 ||1 ||0 ||1 ||10
|-
|15 ||align=left|Lee Jong-Hyun ||15:02 ||4-4 ||100 ||0-0 ||0 ||2-2 ||100 ||2 ||2 ||4 ||1 ||0 ||0

||0 ||0 ||10
|-
|align=left colspan=2|Totals || ||28-63 ||44 ||8-22 ||36 ||15-17 ||88 ||7 ||20 ||27 ||20 ||10 ||8 ||1 ||6 ||79
|}

7th place

Jordan vs. Kazakhstan

|-
|4 ||align=left|Fadel Alnajjar ||26:05 ||2-7 ||29 ||1-4 ||25 ||0-0 ||0 ||1 ||6 ||7 ||8 ||3 ||4 ||0 ||0 ||5
|-
|5 ||align=left|Ahmad al Dwairi ||20:07 ||5-7 ||71 ||0-0 ||0 ||0-0 ||0 ||2 ||1 ||3 ||1 ||2 ||0 ||1 ||1 ||10
|-
|6 ||align=left|Hani Alfaraj ||24:41 ||6-9 ||67 ||2-2 ||100 ||1-1 ||100 ||0 ||4 ||4 ||1 ||3 ||0 ||1 ||0 ||15
|-
|7 ||align=left|Ahmad Alhamarsheh ||20:09 ||1-1 ||100 ||0-0 ||0 ||2-2 ||100 ||0 ||4 ||4 ||6 ||1 ||0 ||0 ||0 ||4
|-
|8 ||align=left|Jimmy Baxter ||18:47 ||4-7 ||57 ||3-4 ||75 ||1-2 ||50 ||0 ||0 ||0 ||8 ||1 ||1 ||0 ||0 ||12
|-
|9 ||align=left|Khaldoon Abu-Ruqayyah ||23:27 ||3-6 ||50 ||1-3 ||33 ||1-3 ||33 ||0 ||3 ||3 ||1 ||0 ||2 ||1 ||0 ||8
|-
|10 ||align=left|Abdallah AbuQoura ||17:57 ||0-1 ||0 ||0-0 ||0 ||2-6 ||33 ||1 ||3 ||4 ||0 ||1 ||2 ||0 ||0 ||2
|-
|11 ||align=left|Wesam Al-Sous ||colspan=16 align=left|Did not play 
|-
|12 ||align=left|Mahmoud Abdeen ||15:13 ||7-8 ||88 ||4-5 ||80 ||2-2 ||100 ||0 ||2 ||2 ||2 ||2 ||0 ||1 ||0 ||20
|-
|13 ||align=left|Mohammad Shaher Hussein ||16:24 ||5-10 ||50 ||0-0 ||0 ||0-0 ||0 ||1 ||5 ||6 ||0 ||5 ||2 ||0 ||1 ||10
|-
|14 ||align=left|Mohammad Hadrab ||colspan=16 align=left|Did not play 
|-
|15 ||align=left|Ali Jamal Zaghab ||17:04 ||1-2 ||50 ||0-0 ||0 ||0-2 ||0 ||0 ||5 ||5 ||0 ||0 ||1 ||0 ||0 ||2
|-
|align=left colspan=2|Totals || ||34-58 ||59 ||11-18 ||61 ||9-18 ||50 ||5 ||33 ||38 ||27 ||18 ||12 ||4 ||2 ||88
|}

|-
|4 ||align=left|Timur Sultanov ||26:23 ||2-6 ||33 ||1-4 ||25 ||0-0 ||0 ||1 ||2 ||3 ||2 ||3 ||4 ||2 ||0 ||5
|-
|5 ||align=left|Jerry Jamar Johnson ||24:06 ||1-5 ||20 ||1-2 ||50 ||1-2 ||50 ||1 ||1 ||2 ||3 ||2 ||0 ||1 ||0 ||4
|-
|6 ||align=left|Rustam Murzagaliyev ||colspan=16 align=left|Did not play 
|-00
|7 ||align=left|Mikhail Yevstigneyev ||20:43 ||3-16 ||19 ||1-2 ||50 ||2-2 ||100 ||4 ||5 ||9 ||0 ||3 ||2 ||2 ||0 ||9
|-
|8 ||align=left|Vitaliy Lapchenko ||18:28 ||0-2 ||0 ||0-1 ||0 ||0-0 ||0 ||1 ||3 ||4 ||0 ||2 ||2 ||0 ||0 ||0
|-
|9 ||align=left|Nikolay Bazhini ||23:58 ||3-8 ||38 ||1-4 ||25 ||0-0 ||0 ||1 ||3 ||4 ||1 ||1 ||0 ||1 ||2 ||7
|-
|10 ||align=left|Konstantin Dvirnyy ||colspan=16 align=left|Did not play 
|-
|11 ||align=left|Anton Ponomarev ||05:30 ||2-2 ||100 ||0-0 ||0 ||0-0 ||0 ||0 ||0 ||0 ||0 ||0 ||0 ||0 ||0 ||4
|-
|12 ||align=left|Dmitriy Klimov ||15:41 ||3-7 ||43 ||1-3 ||33 ||1-2 ||50 ||2 ||3 ||5 ||1 ||1 ||3 ||0 ||0 ||8
|-
|13 ||align=left|Rustam Yargaliyev ||32:42 ||7-12 ||58 ||2-6 ||33 ||1-2 ||50 ||0 ||1 ||1 ||1 ||1 ||1 ||0 ||0 ||17
|-
|14 ||align=left|Leonid Bondarovich ||08:25 ||0-2 ||0 ||0-0 ||0 ||2-2 ||100 ||0 ||1 ||1 ||0 ||1 ||1 ||0 ||0 ||2
|-
|15 ||align=left|Alexander Zhigulin ||23:58 ||0-2 ||0 ||0-2 ||0 ||3-4 ||75 ||0 ||3 ||3 ||0 ||5 ||1 ||0 ||0 ||3
|-
|align=left colspan=2|Totals || ||21-62 ||34 ||7-24 ||29 ||10-14 ||71 ||10 ||22 ||32 ||8 ||19 ||14 ||6 ||2 ||59
|}

5th place

Qatar vs. China

|-
|4 ||align=left|Mansour El Hadary || 35:09 || 9-14 || 64 || 2-2 || 100 || 3-4 || 75 || 1 || 2 || 3 || 5 || 1 || 0 || 0 || 3 || 23
|-
|5 ||align=left|Jarvis Hayes || colspan=16 align=left|Did not play
|-
|6 ||align=left|Abdulrahman Saad || 15:09 || 5-9 || 56 || 3-6 || 50 || 0-0 || 0 || 2 || 2 || 4 || 3 || 0 || 3 || 0 || 3 || 13
|-
|7 ||align=left|Daoud Musa || 29:14 || 1-6 || 17 || 0-5 || 0 || 3-4 || 75 || 0 || 4 || 4 || 4 || 2 || 1 || 0 || 2 || 5
|-
|8 ||align=left|Khalid Suliman || 12:32 || 0-3 || 0 || 0-2 || 0 || 2-4 || 50 || 0 || 1 || 1 || 1 || 4 || 2 || 0 || 0 || 2
|-
|9 ||align=left|Ali Turki Ali || 21:52 || 1-7 || 14 || 0-6 || 0 || 0-0 || 0 || 0 || 2 || 2 || 2 || 1 || 0 || 0 || 1 || 2
|-
|10 ||align=left|Yasseen Musa || colspan=16 align=left|Did not play
|-
|11 ||align=left|Erfan Ali Saeed || colspan=16 align=left|Did not play
|-
|12 ||align=left|Mohammed Saleem Abdulla || 29:06 || 1-5 || 20 || 0-1 || 0 || 0-0 || 0 || 2 || 8 || 10 || 0 || 1 || 0 || 0 || 5 || 2
|-
|13 ||align=left|Mohammed Yousef || 27:21 || 5-9 || 56 || 0-1 || 0 || 3-3 || 100 || 4 || 3 || 7 || 0 || 5 || 0 || 0 || 5 || 13
|-
|14 ||align=left|Malek Saleem || 07:39 || 1-3 || 33 || 1-2 || 50 || 0-0 || 0 || 0 || 0 || 0 || 0 || 0 || 0 || 0 || 2 || 3
|-
|15 ||align=left|Baker Ahmad Mohammed || 21:52 || 10-11 || 91 || 0-0 || 0 || 2-3 || 67 || 0 || 2 || 2 || 3 || 2 || 3 || 0 || 2 || 22
|-
|align=left colspan=2|Totals || || 33-67 || 49 || 6-25 || 24 || 13-18 || 72 || 9 || 24 || 33 || 18 || 16 || 9 || 0 || 23 || 85
|}

|-
|4 ||align=left|Guo Ailun || 25:54 || 8-10 || 80 || 0-2 || 0 || 5-6 || 83 || 0 || 1 || 1 || 5 || 0 || 1 || 0 || 3 || 21
|-
|5 ||align=left|Liu Xiaoyu || 13:11 || 1-2 || 50 || 0-0 || 0 || 0-0 || 0 || 0 || 1 || 1 || 2 || 0 || 0 || 0 || 2 || 2
|-
|6 ||align=left|Chen Jianghua || colspan=16 align=left|Did not play
|-
|7 ||align=left|Wang Shipeng || 30:43 || 4-8 || 50 || 4-7 || 57 || 2-2 || 100 || 0 || 2 || 2 || 2 || 3 || 1 || 0 || 1 || 14
|-
|8 ||align=left|Zhu Fangyu || 28:53 || 3-5 || 60 || 2-4 || 50 || 2-4 || 50 || 2 || 2 || 4 || 1 || 2 || 1 || 0 || 3 || 10
|-
|9 ||align=left|Sun Yue || 09:36 || 1-1 || 100 || 1-1 || 100 || 0-0 || 0 || 0 || 2 || 2 || 1 || 0 || 0 || 0 || 1 || 3
|-
|10 ||align=left|Li Xiaoxu || colspan=16 align=left|Did not play
|-
|11 ||align=left|Yi Jianlian || 21:00 || 5-10 || 50 || 0-1 || 0 || 2-2 || 100 || 2 || 1 || 3 || 2 || 2 || 0 || 1 || 4 || 12
|-
|12 ||align=left|Zhang Bo || 15:05 || 1-1 || 100 || 0-0 || 0 || 2-2 || 100 || 1 || 0 || 1 || 2 || 0 || 0 || 0 || 1 || 4
|-
|13 ||align=left|Wang Zhelin || 14:51 || 4-6 || 67 || 0-0 || 0 || 1-2 || 50 || 2 || 3 || 5 || 0 || 3 || 0 || 0 || 4 || 9
|-
|14 ||align=left|Wang Zhizhi || 18:48 || 3-8 || 38 || 0-0 || 0 || 7-9 || 78 || 2 || 9 || 11 || 1 || 3 || 0 || 1 || 0 || 13
|-
|15 ||align=left|Zhou Peng || 21:55 || 3-11 || 27 || 1-3 || 33 || 1-2 || 50 || 1 || 5 || 6 || 0 || 4 || 1 || 0 || 1 || 8
|-
|align=left colspan=2|Totals || || 33-62 || 53 || 8-18 || 44 || 22-29 || 76 || 10 || 26 || 36 || 16 || 17 || 4 || 2 || 20 || 96
|}

3rd place

Chinese Taipei vs. Korea

|-
|4 ||align=left|Tseng Wen-ting ||20:42 ||3-6 ||50 ||0-0 ||0 ||1-5 ||20 ||3 ||2 ||5 ||1 ||1 ||1 ||0 ||1 ||7
|-
|5 ||align=left|Quincy Davis ||36:25 ||4-6 ||67 ||0-0 ||0 ||4-8 ||50 ||1 ||7 ||8 ||1 ||1 ||2 ||0 ||1 ||12
|-
|6 ||align=left|Lee Hsueh-lin ||colspan=16 align=left|Did not play 
|-
|7 ||align=left|Tien Lei ||22:51 ||3-6 ||50 ||1-3 ||33 ||1-1 ||100 ||1 ||3 ||4 ||1 ||1 ||3 ||1 ||0 ||8
|-
|8 ||align=left|Chen Shih-chieh ||16:00 ||1-8 ||13 ||0-2 ||0 ||4-4 ||100 ||1 ||0 ||1 ||3 ||2 ||1 ||1 ||0 ||6
|-
|9 ||align=left|Hung Chih-shan ||27:20 ||2-5 ||40 ||2-5 ||40 ||0-0 ||0 ||0 ||5 ||5 ||2 ||4 ||2 ||0 ||0 ||6
|-
|10 ||align=left|Chou Po-Chen ||colspan=16 align=left|Did not play 
|-
|11 ||align=left|Yang Chin-min ||04:07 ||1-2 ||50 ||0-1 ||0 ||0-0 ||0 ||0 ||0 ||0 ||0 ||0 ||0 ||0 ||0 ||2
|-
|12 ||align=left|Lin Chih-chieh ||19:57 ||0-6 ||0 ||0-3 ||0 ||0-0 ||0 ||0 ||2 ||2 ||4 ||0 ||4 ||2 ||0 ||0
|-
|13 ||align=left|Lu Cheng-ju ||24:59 ||5-10 ||50 ||2-5 ||40 ||1-1 ||100 ||0 ||1 ||1 ||0 ||3 ||3 ||0 ||0 ||13
|-
|14 ||align=left|Tsai Wen-cheng ||27:34 ||1-6 ||17 ||0-1 ||0 ||1-2 ||50 ||2 ||4 ||6 ||0 ||1 ||1 ||0 ||0 ||3
|-
|15 ||align=left|Douglas Creighton ||colspan=16 align=left|Did not play 
|-
|align=left colspan=2|Totals || ||20-55 ||36 ||5-20 ||25 ||12-21 ||57 ||8 ||24 ||32 ||12 ||13 ||17 ||4 ||2 ||57
|}

|-
|4 ||align=left|Kim Min-Goo ||24:52 ||8-14 ||57 ||5-10 ||50 ||0-0 ||0 ||3 ||1 ||4 ||3 ||1 ||1 ||1 ||1 ||21
|-
|5 ||align=left|Kim Sun-Hyung ||colspan=16 align=left|Did not play 
|-
|6 ||align=left|Yang Dong-Geun ||29:00 ||3-11 ||27 ||1-5 ||20 ||2-2 ||100 ||0 ||2 ||2 ||8 ||3 ||2 ||0 ||2 ||9
|-00
|7 ||align=left|Kim Tae-Sul ||14:08 ||2-5 ||40 ||1-1 ||100 ||2-2 ||100 ||0 ||3 ||3 ||1 ||0 ||0 ||2 ||0 ||7
|-
|8 ||align=left|Moon Seong-Gon ||colspan=16 align=left|Did not play 
|-
|9 ||align=left|Yun Ho-Young ||20:10 ||4-6 ||67 ||1-1 ||100 ||0-0 ||0 ||1 ||7 ||8 ||2 ||5 ||0 ||1 ||0 ||9
|-
|10 ||align=left|Cho Sung-Min ||31:48 ||3-7 ||43 ||3-5 ||60 ||2-2 ||100 ||0 ||2 ||2 ||4 ||3 ||0 ||0 ||0 ||11
|-
|11 ||align=left|Kim Joo-Sung ||28:05 ||6-14 ||43 ||0-1 ||0 ||0-0 ||0 ||3 ||5 ||8 ||1 ||3 ||1 ||0 ||0 ||12
|-
|12 ||align=left|Kim Jong-Kyu ||22:41 ||2-4 ||50 ||0-0 ||0 ||0-0 ||0 ||1 ||3 ||4 ||1 ||3 ||1 ||0 ||0 ||4
|-
|13 ||align=left|Choi Jun-Yong ||colspan=16 align=left|Did not play 
|-
|14 ||align=left|Lee Seung-Jun ||12:27 ||0-2 ||0 ||0-1 ||0 ||0-0 ||0 ||1 ||1 ||2 ||0 ||2 ||2 ||1 ||0 ||0
|-
|15 ||align=left|Lee Jong-Hyun ||16:45 ||1-2 ||50 ||0-0 ||0 ||0-0 ||0 ||1 ||1 ||2 ||1 ||2 ||2 ||0 ||3 ||2
|-
|align=left colspan=2|Totals || ||29-65 ||45 ||11-24 ||46 ||6-6 ||100 ||10 ||25 ||35 ||21 ||22 ||9 ||5 ||6 ||75
|}

Final

Philippines vs. Iran

|-
|4 ||align=left|Jimmy Alapag ||20:38 ||4-8 ||50 ||3-6 ||50 ||2-2 ||100 ||0 ||0 ||0 ||3 ||1 ||1 ||0 ||0 ||13
|-
|5 ||align=left|LA Tenorio ||19:09 ||3-8 ||38 ||2-6 ||33 ||0-0 ||0 ||0 ||3 ||3 ||3 ||3 ||1 ||1 ||0 ||8
|-
|6 ||align=left|Jeffrei Chan ||15:38 ||2-6 ||33 ||1-5 ||20 ||2-2 ||100 ||1 ||1 ||2 ||0 ||2 ||1 ||0 ||0 ||7
|-
|7 ||align=left|Jayson William ||27:55 ||5-13 ||38 ||1-2 ||50 ||7-9 ||78 ||0 ||1 ||1 ||3 ||0 ||3 ||0 ||0 ||18
|-
|8 ||align=left|Gary David ||05:16 ||1-3 ||33 ||0-0 ||0 ||0-0 ||0 ||0 ||0 ||0 ||1 ||3 ||0 ||0 ||0 ||2
|-
|9 ||align=left|Ranidel de Ocampo ||27:09 ||3-13 ||23 ||2-8 ||25 ||1-1 ||100 ||3 ||3 ||6 ||1 ||4 ||1 ||3 ||0 ||9
|-
|10 ||align=left|Gabe Norwood ||27:32 ||0-4 ||0 ||0-2 ||0 ||3-4 ||75 ||1 ||2 ||3 ||2 ||3 ||1 ||3 ||0 ||3
|-
|11 ||align=left|Marcus Douthit ||colspan=16 align=left|Did not play 
|-
|12 ||align=left|Larry Fonacier ||11:26 ||1-4 ||25 ||1-3 ||33 ||0-0 ||0 ||0 ||1 ||1 ||1 ||1 ||0 ||0 ||0 ||3
|-
|13 ||align=left|June Mar Fajardo ||08:17 ||0-2 ||0 ||0-0 ||0 ||1-2 ||50 ||3 ||1 ||4 ||0 ||2 ||1 ||0 ||0 ||1
|-
|14 ||align=left|Japeth Aguilar ||16:58 ||2-7 ||29 ||0-2 ||0 ||0-1 ||0 ||1 ||3 ||4 ||0 ||4 ||0 ||1 ||0 ||4
|-
|15 ||align=left|Marc Pingris ||19:56 ||1-1 ||100 ||0-0 ||0 ||1-2 ||50 ||3 ||5 ||8 ||0 ||3 ||1 ||2 ||0 ||3
|-
|align=left colspan=2|Totals || ||22-69 ||32 ||10-34 ||29 ||17-23 ||74 ||12 ||20 ||32 ||14 ||26 ||10 ||10 ||0 ||71
|}

|-
|4 ||align=left|Mohammad Jamshidi ||colspan=16 align=left|Did not play 
|-
|5 ||align=left|Aren Davoudi ||21:46 ||1-3 ||33 ||0-2 ||0 ||0-0 ||0 ||0 ||2 ||2 ||3 ||1 ||1 ||0 ||0 ||2
|-
|6 ||align=left|Javad Davari ||colspan=16 align=left|Did not play 
|-
|7 ||align=left|Mehdi Kamrani ||35:09 ||5-13 ||38 ||2-6 ||33 ||3-4 ||75 ||3 ||4 ||7 ||5 ||3 ||3 ||1 ||0 ||15
|-
|8 ||align=left|Saman Veisi ||colspan=16 align=left|Did not play 
|-
|9 ||align=left|Oshin Sahakian ||28:40 ||3-7 ||43 ||0-3 ||0 ||6-6 ||100 ||1 ||11 ||12 ||2 ||4 ||1 ||0 ||0 ||12
|-
|10 ||align=left|Hamed Afagh ||33:57 ||2-6 ||33 ||0-4 ||0 ||0-0 ||0 ||2 ||3 ||5 ||1 ||1 ||3 ||1 ||0 ||4
|-
|11 ||align=left|Hamed Sohrabnejad ||10:01 ||1-2 ||50 ||0-0 ||0 ||0-0 ||0 ||0 ||4 ||4 ||0 ||2 ||1 ||0 ||0 ||2
|-
|12 ||align=left|Asghar Kardoust ||08:36 ||1-1 ||100 ||0-0 ||0 ||0-0 ||0 ||0 ||2 ||2 ||0 ||1 ||0 ||0 ||0 ||2
|-
|13 ||align=left|Rouzbeh Arghavan ||00:48 ||0-0 ||0 ||0-0 ||0 ||0-0 ||0 ||0 ||0 ||0 ||0 ||1 ||0 ||0 ||0 ||0
|-
|14 ||align=left|Samad Nikkhah Bahrami ||31:54 ||5-14 ||36 ||1-2 ||50 ||8-9 ||89 ||1 ||2 ||3 ||7 ||4 ||6 ||0 ||0 ||19
|-
|15 ||align=left|Hamed Haddadi ||29:06 ||12-15 ||80 ||0-0 ||0 ||5-7 ||71 ||6 ||10 ||16 ||2 ||4 ||3 ||0 ||2 ||29
|-
|align=left colspan=2|Totals || ||30-61 ||49 ||3-17 ||18 ||22-26 ||85 ||13 ||38 ||51 ||20 ||21 ||18 ||2 ||2 ||85
|}

final round
Iran at the 2013 FIBA Asia Championship
2013–14 in Jordanian basketball
2013–14 in Taiwanese basketball
2013–14 in Chinese basketball
Philippines at the 2013 FIBA Asia Championship
2013–14 in Kazakhstani basketball
2013–14 in South Korean basketball
2013 in Qatari sport